The 2022–23 Montenegrin First League is the 17th season of the first tier association football in the country of Montenegro. The season began on 23 July 2022 and will be ended on 24 May 2023. The winners of the league will be qualified for a place in the 2023–24 UEFA Champions League.

Sutjeska were the defending champions having won the league in the previous season.

Teams

FK Podgorica (relegated after three years in the top flight) and Zeta (never relegated from the top flight) were relegated after finishing tenth in the previous season. Jedinstvo (promoted after a five-year absence) and Arsenal (promoted for the first time in its history) will replace them in the league after earning promotion from the Montenegrin Second League as league champions in the previous season.

Stadiums and locations

Personnel and kits

Note: Flags indicate national team as has been defined under FIFA eligibility rules. Players may hold more than one non-FIFA nationality.

League table

Results
Clubs were scheduled to play each other four times for a total of 36 matches each.

First half of season

Second half of season

Statistics

Top goalscorers

See also 
 Montenegrin First League

References

External links 
 UEFA
 FSCG

Montenegrin First League seasons
Monte
1